Meat Market is a 2000 Canadian horror film directed and written by Brian Clement, based on a story by Nick Sheehan and Tania Willard.  It stars Claire Westby and Paul Pedrosa as survivors of a zombie apocalypse who team up with a masked Mexican wrestler and a trio of vampires.  The film was followed by two sequels, Meat Market 2 and Meat Market 3.

Plot 
Ex-bounty hunters Argenta and Shahrokh discover that a wave of murders is the work of zombies.  They team up with a trio of female vampires – Nemesis, Valeria, and Tiamat – and a masked Mexican wrestler, El Diablo Azul, against the zombies.  Eventually, they learn that the zombies are reanimated by nanobots, which gives the zombies a collective consciousness.  In the end, the scientist who created them is killed by his own creations.

Cast 
 Claire Westby as Argenta
 Paul Pedrosa as Shahrokh
 Alison Therriault as Nemesis
 Teresa Simon as Valeria
 Chelsey Arentsen as Tiamat
 Cam Pipes as El Diablo Azul
 Ivan Meade as El Diablo Azul (voice)
 Ken Peters as Dr. Oppenheim
 Clifton Mitchell as Lt. Ayers
 Bryn Johnson as Pvt. Holden

Release 
Sub Rosa Studios released the film in a bundle with the sequel in January 2007.

Reception 
Bloody Disgusting rated the film 2.5/5 stars and said that the rating would have been lower had it not been an independent film, though the special effects were described as "decent".  Beyond Hollywood wrote that the film "suffers from every known pitfall of no-budget filmmaking, but in the end still manages to impress — if just slightly."  Writing in The Zombie Movie Encyclopedia Volume 2, Peter Dendle called it a "sad opus shot on Super VHS" that shows little of the creativity that goes into low budget labors of love.

References

External links 
 

2000 films
2000 horror films
Canadian science fiction horror films
Canadian independent films
English-language Canadian films
Canadian zombie films
Canadian vampire films
Camcorder films
Films directed by Brian Clement
2000 directorial debut films
2000s English-language films
2000s Canadian films